Leroy Van Dam (born 7 November 1993) is a professional rugby union player. He can play at Wing and full-back and is currently playing for Aurillac in the Pro D2.

Career

Van Dam first played rugby for an Under 6 team in New Zealand.

Van Dam has also played junior rugby for the following sides; Auckland U18s, Blues U18s and Auckland under 20's.

He has featured with the New Zealand U20s and appeared at three Mitre 10 Cup teams – Manawatu, Bay of Plenty and Otago making a handful of senior appearances for each.

He briefly played for Valley RFC in the Hong Kong Premiership, before being signed by Jersey Reds, ahead of the 2018-2019 RFU Championship Season.

Van Dam capped a successful debut year at Jersey Reds. Scoring 40 points, in 20 appearances for the RFU Championship side. 

On 3 April 2020, Van Dam left Jersey to join Pro D2 outfit Aurillac in France from the 2020-21 season.

References

External links

All Blacks U20 Profile:
http://www.allblacks.com/Player/u20/2301

1993 births
New Zealand rugby union players
Jersey Reds players
Living people
Rugby union wings
Rugby union fullbacks
Rugby union players from Auckland
People from Morrinsville
Rugby union players from Waikato
Stade Aurillacois Cantal Auvergne players
Bay of Plenty rugby union players
Otago rugby union players
Valley RFC players
New Zealand expatriate rugby union players
New Zealand expatriate sportspeople in Hong Kong
New Zealand expatriate sportspeople in France
Expatriate rugby union players in Hong Kong
Expatriate rugby union players in France
New Zealand expatriate sportspeople in Jersey
Expatriate rugby union players in Jersey